A number of steamships were named Rhenania, including -

, a German cargo ship that was wrecked in 1912
, a German cargo ship that sank in 1927
, a German cargo liner in service 1904–15
, a German cargo ship in service 1923–34

Ship names